

Georg Neuffer (18 April 1895 – 11 May 1977) was a general in the Luftwaffe of Nazi Germany during World War II. He was a recipient of the Knight's Cross of the Iron Cross. Neuffer surrendered to the British troops in May 1943, following the surrender of German troops in North Africa. He was released in October 1947.

Awards and decorations

 Knight's Cross of the Iron Cross on 1 August 1943 as Generalmajor and commander of  20. Flak-Division (mot.)

References

Citations

Bibliography

 

1895 births
1977 deaths
Luftwaffe World War II generals
German Army personnel of World War I
People from the Upper Palatinate
Recipients of the clasp to the Iron Cross, 1st class
Recipients of the Knight's Cross of the Iron Cross
German prisoners of war in World War II held by the United Kingdom
People from the Kingdom of Bavaria
Military personnel from Bavaria
Lieutenant generals of the Luftwaffe